Working the Engels is a Canadian-American sitcom television series that premiered on Global on March 12, 2014, and was also a part of NBC's  summer schedule, having premiered on July 10, 2014. Produced by Halfire-CORE Entertainment, it marked the first time that U.S. and Canadian broadcasters had collaborated in producing a half-hour network sitcom.

The show stars Kacey Rohl as Jenna Engel, a daughter trying to keep her father's law firm running to support her family. The cast also includes Andrea Martin, Azura Skye and Benjamin Arthur.

The series was created and written by Katie Ford and Jane Ford.

While all 12 episodes aired in Canada, only the first five episodes aired in the U.S. On August 20, 2014, NBC announced that the show had been canceled, and that it had pulled the remaining episodes from the schedule.

Cast
Andrea Martin as Ceil Engel
Kacey Rohl as Jenna Engel
Azura Skye as Sandy Engel-Karinsky
Benjamin Arthur as Jimmy Engel

Recurring
Colin Mochrie as Miles
Jennifer Irwin as Charisse
Martin Short as Charles "Chuck" Pastry
Gregory Smith as Johnny
Eugene Levy as Arthur Horowitz

Episodes

References

External links

 
 

2014 Canadian television series debuts
2014 Canadian television series endings
2010s Canadian sitcoms
2010s Canadian workplace comedy television series
Global Television Network original programming
Canadian legal television series
NBC original programming